Showtek is a Dutch electronic dance music duo consisting of two brothers from Eindhoven, Sjoerd (born 6 April 1984) and Wouter Janssen (born 20 August 1982). The duo regularly manages to reach the top of multiple music charts and work with artists such as Tiësto, Chris Brown and David Guetta. Showtek was ranked 17th in the Top 100 DJs list of 2014 but by the magazine's 2016 list, they had dropped to 96th. The brothers, who have been musically active since 2001, also offer podcasts on their own radio show on the music streaming service iTunes.

Biography 
The brothers Wouter Janssen and Sjoerd Janssen began their musical career in electronic music, specifically in techno music in 2001 and subsequently moved to hardstyle in 2003. At that time, Wouter usually produced hard trance under the stage name of Walt, and Sjoerd hardstyle as Duro. They released their first album, Today Is Tomorrow in 2007 under their independent label Dutch Master Works. The album was well received in the Dutch music charts, reaching 68th place, and received a score of 95/100 on Partyflock. In 2009, their second album, Analogue Players in a Digital World, was unveiled at the Amsterdam Dance Event in the Netherlands and circulated by the Central Station Records. The album was well received by the press, which also allows them access to rewards. The duo uses multiple aliases including but not limited to; Dutch Masters, Headliner, Lowrider, Unibass, DJ Duro, Walt, Walt Janssen, Mr. Puta, Boys Will Be Boys and Alan Misael.

In 2011, the group collaborated on the album Kiss from the Past by Allure, one of the musical projects of Dutch producer Tiësto. In 2012, they collaborated with Tiësto again on the singles "Miami / Chasing Summers" included in the album Club Life: Volume Two Miami, and on a single titled "Hell Yeah!". In 2012, the Showtek brothers began a series of collaborations, a project called Crazy Collabs, with producers from some of the other genres in dance music. Before the official announcement of their collaboration, they co-produced an EP with Tiësto and Angger Dimas entitled "We Rock" as Boys Will Be Boys. They have also worked with Tiësto, Hardwell, Justin Prime, Bassjackers, Ookay, MAKJ, and Noisecontrollers. Showtek also co-produced the upcoming single of Chris Brown entitled Nobody's Perfect with Lukas Hilbert and David Jost. Showtek has their own podcast, which is available through their website and iTunes.

In December 2013, the duo recently founded their own label "Skink", which is licensed to Spinnin Records but isn't a sub-label. The song "We Like To Party" by Showtek was the first title to be released under the new label.

In 2014, they collaborate with Vassy and David Guetta for the single "Bad", which was listed for 239 weeks on 19 different music charts.

Discography

Albums

Studio albums

Compilation albums

Mix albums

Extended plays

Singles 

Notes

Other charted songs

Remixes 
2010: System F — "Out Of The Blue 2010" (Showtek Remix)
2013: Carly Rae Jepsen — "Tonight I'm Getting Over You" (Showtek Remix)
2014: Eva Shaw — "Jungle Space" (Showtek Edit)
2015: David Guetta featuring Sam Martin — "Lovers on the Sun" (Showtek Remix)
2019: Major Lazer featuring Skip Marley — "Can't Take It From Me" (Showtek Remix)

References

Notes 
 "Get Loose" did not chart on the Flemish Ultratop singles chart, but did peak at number 79 on the Ultratip chart, which tracks the top 100 songs that have not made the Ultratop 50.

Sources

External links 
 Official website

Dutch DJs
Remixers
Musical groups established in 2001
Dutch musical duos
Dutch electronic music groups
Hardstyle musicians
Sibling musical duos
Spinnin' Records artists
Electronic dance music duos
Progressive house musicians
Future house musicians
Revealed Recordings artists
Owsla artists
Electronic dance music DJs